Professional wrestling is a form of theater that revolves around mock combat matches that are usually performed in a ring similar to the kind used in boxing. The dramatic aspects of pro wrestling may be performed both in the ring or—as in televised wrestling shows—in backstage areas of the venue, in similar form to reality television.

Professional wrestling as a form of theater evolved out of the widespread practice of match fixing among wrestlers in the early 20th century. Rather than sanction the wrestlers for their deceit as was done with boxers, the public instead came to see professional wrestling as a performance art rather than a sport, mainly because it was more entertaining when faked. Professional wrestlers responded to the public's attitude by dispensing with verisimilitude in favor of entertainment, adding melodrama, gimmickry, and outlandish stuntwork to their performances. Although the mock combat they performed ceased to resemble any authentic wrestling form, the wrestlers nevertheless continued to pretend that it was authentic, and the fans played along—this is a tradition known as kayfabe.

History

United States

In America following the civil war of 1861-1865, wrestling was a popular sport, with catch wrestling emerging as the most popular style. At first, professional wrestlers were genuine competitive athletes, but they increasingly fixed their matches to the point that by the end of the century, nearly all professional wrestling matches were fixed. There were a number of reasons for this practice. Most importantly, a fixed match could be choreographed to make for a more entertaining spectacle (Greco-Roman wrestling in particular was boring to watch). For another thing, fixing matches was convenient for scheduling. A real ("shoot") match could sometimes last hours, whereas a fixed match can be made short, which was convenient for wrestlers on tour who needed to keep appointments, or who needed to share venues (not to mention the audiences preferred short matches). Fixed matches also carried less risk of injury, which meant shorter recovery.

A major influence on professional wrestling was carnival culture. Wrestlers around the turn of the 20th century sometimes worked as carnival attractions. For a fee, a visitor could challenge the wrestler to a quick match. If the challenger defeated the champion in a short time frame, usually 15 minutes, he won a prize. Such carnival wrestlers used catch wrestling because they could quickly defeat their challengers with a painful hold. To encourage visitors, the carnival operators staged rigged matches in which a plant in the audience challenged the champion and won, giving the audience the impression that the champion was easy to beat. This practice taught wrestlers the art of staging rigged matches and fostered a mentality that spectators were marks to be duped. The term kayfabe is thought to come from carny slang.

By the turn of the 20th century, most wrestling matches were fixed, and journalists regularly exposed the practice.

Several reasons explain why professional wrestling became fake whereas boxing endured as a legitimate sport. Firstly, wrestling was more entertaining when it was faked, whereas fakery did not make boxing any more entertaining. Secondly, in a rigged boxing match, the designated loser must take a real beating for his "defeat" to be convincing, but wrestling holds can be faked convincingly without inflicting injury. This meant that boxers were less willing to "take dives", they wanted to have a victory for all the pain to which they subjected themselves.

In the early years of the 20th century, boxing suffered periodic bans in various states and counties over concerns of match fixing. Professional wrestling somehow escaped similar bans despite match fixing being more common, which suggests that the public did not care about the integrity of professional wrestling and accepted it as performance art. Since the public knew that almost all professional wrestling matches were faked, nobody ever felt cheated because nobody was fooled. Since a substantial number of boxers fought honest shoot matches, the public could not tell whether a boxing match was honest or rigged, and consequently felt cheated occasionally.

Promotional cartels for professional wrestling emerged in the 1910s in the East Coast of the United States (up to that point, professional wrestling's heartland was in the Midwest). The promoters routinely fixed the matches to make them more entertaining. For instance, it allowed them to artificially turn their more charismatic wrestlers into champions; audiences preferred charismatic champions to boorish ones. Fixing matches was also more convenient for scheduling. With shoot matches, a promoter would often have to wait to see who won the match before making further plans with either participant. Fixed matches were also less strenuous for the wrestlers, thereby allowing them to recover more quickly and perform more frequently.

The promoter cartels quashed what little authenticity professional wrestling still had. Before the cartels, professional wrestlers occasionally had to fight authentic (shoot) matches to preserve their credibility. As promoters gained control over more of the country's wrestlers, fewer independent wrestlers could publicly challenge the promoters' wrestlers to shoot matches. If an independent wrestler made a public challenge, the cartel wrestler could use his contractual obligations to his promoter as an excuse to refuse the challenge.

Some promoters even used "policemen" to deter independent wrestlers from challenging their stars. These “policemen” were powerful wrestlers who lacked the charisma to become stars. The independent would be forced to face the “policeman” first, who would give the independent a vicious thrashing that would put fear in him and force him to spend a long time recovering.

Promoters also had to deal with "double-crosses", wherein a wrestler who had agreed to throw a match instead actually fought and won, forcing the promoter to award him the title of champion for the sake of preserving the facade of sport. The promoters punished such wrestlers by blacklisting them. Blacklisting could be fatal for the wrestler's career, such was the dominance of the cartel.

By the early 1930s, most wrestlers had adopted personas to generate public interest. These personas could broadly be characterized as either faces (likeable) or heels (villainous). Native Americans, cowboys, and English aristocrats were staple characters in the 1930s and 1940s. Wrestlers also often used some sort of gimmick, such as a signature move, eccentric mannerisms, or out-of-control behavior (in the case of heels). The matches could also be gimmicky, such as the wrestlers fighting in mud or in a pile of tomatoes. The most successful and enduring gimmick to emerge from the 1930s was tag-team matches. Promoters noticed that matches slowed down as the wrestlers in the ring tired, so they gave them partners to relieve them. It also gave heels another way to misbehave by double-teaming.

Wrestling promoters struggled to find wrestlers who were both trained in authentic wrestling forms and had charisma. Towards the end of the 1930s, faced with declining revenues, promoters chose to focus on grooming wrestlers who, regardless of their skill, could draw crowds. By this time, most of the public knew and accepted that professional wrestling was performance art, so a background in authentic wrestling no longer mattered. After this time, matches became more outlandish and gimmicky, and any semblance professional wrestling had to catch wrestling faded. The personas of the wrestlers likewise grew more outlandish. Although the wrestlers no longer cared to make their mock combat look convincing, they still pretended it was authentic.

Unlike boxing, professional wrestling didn't take off on the radio because the action was difficult for ringside announcers to describe. Professional wrestling did become very popular on television, however. The first televised professional wrestling was in 1939, but televised wrestling really took off after World War 2.

In 1989, Vince McMahon testified before the New Jersey Athletic Commission that professional wrestling is not a competitive sport and that its matches have predetermined outcomes. He did this to have the World Wrestling Federation (his business) exempted from sports licensing fees. Shortly thereafter, New Jersey deregulated professional wrestling. The WWF rebranded itself as a "sports entertainment" company.

Scope and influence 

Show wrestling has become especially prominent in Central/North America, Japan and Europe (especially the United Kingdom). In Brazil, there was a very popular wrestling television program from the 1960s to the early 1980s called Telecatch. High-profile figures in the sport have become celebrities or cultural icons in their native or adopted home countries.

Although professional wrestling started out as small acts in sideshows, traveling circuses and carnivals, today it is a billion-dollar industry. Revenue is drawn from ticket sales, network television broadcasts, pay-per-view broadcasts, branded merchandise and home video. Pro wrestling was instrumental in making pay-per-view a viable method of content delivery. Annual shows such as WrestleMania, Bound for Glory, Wrestle Kingdom and formerly Starrcade are among the highest-selling pay-per-view programming each year. In modern day, internet programming has been utilized by a number of companies to air web shows, internet pay per views (IPPVs) or on-demand content, helping to generate internet-related revenue earnings from the evolving World Wide Web.

Home video sales dominate the Billboard charts Recreational Sports DVD sales, with wrestling holding anywhere from 3 to 9 of the top 10 spots every week.

Due to its persistent cultural presence and to its novelty within the performing arts, wrestling constitutes a recurring topic in both academia and the media. Several documentaries have been produced looking at professional wrestling, most notable of them being Beyond the Mat directed by Barry W. Blaustein, and Wrestling with Shadows featuring wrestler Bret Hart and directed by Paul Jay. There have also been many fictional depictions of wrestling; the 2008 film The Wrestler received several Oscar nominations and began a career revival for its star Mickey Rourke.

Currently, the largest professional wrestling company worldwide is the United States-based WWE, which bought out many smaller regional companies in the late 20th century, as well as primary competitors World Championship Wrestling (WCW) and Extreme Championship Wrestling (ECW) in early 2001. Other major companies worldwide include All Elite Wrestling (AEW) in the United States, Consejo Mundial de Lucha Libre (CMLL), and Lucha Libre AAA Worldwide (AAA) in Mexico; and the Japanese New Japan Pro-Wrestling (NJPW), All Japan Pro Wrestling (AJPW), and Pro Wrestling Noah promotions.

Industry conventions 

In professional wrestling, two factors decide the way of proceedings: the "in-show" happenings, presented through the shows; and real life happenings outside the work that have implications, such as performer contracts, legitimate injuries, etc. Because actual life events are often co-opted by writers for incorporation into storylines of performers, the lines between real life and fictional life are often blurred and become confused.

Special discern must be taken with people who perform under their own name (such as Kurt Angle and his fictional persona). The actions of the character in shows must be considered fictional, wholly separate from the life of the performer. This is similar to other entertainers who perform with a persona that shares their own name.

Some wrestlers also incorporate elements of their real-life personalities into their characters, even if they and their in-ring persona have different names.

Kayfabe 

Those who participated felt that maintenance of a constant and complete illusion for all who were not involved was necessary to keep audience interest. For decades, wrestlers lived their public lives as though they were their characters.

The practice of keeping the illusion, and the various methods used to do so, came to be known as "kayfabe" within wrestling circles, or "working the marks". An entire lexicon of slang jargon and euphemism developed to allow performers to communicate without outsiders' knowledge of what was being said.

Occasionally a performer will deviate from the intended sequence of events. This is known as a shoot. Sometimes shoot-like elements are included in wrestling stories to blur the line between performance and reality. These are known as "worked shoots". The vast majority of events in professional wrestling are preplanned and improvised within accepted boundaries.

Gradually, the predetermined nature of professional wrestling became an open secret, as prominent figures in the wrestling business (including World Wrestling Entertainment owner Vince McMahon) began to publicly admit that wrestling was entertainment, not competition. This public reveal has garnered mixed reactions from the wrestling community, as some feel that exposure ruins the experience to the spectators as does exposure in illusionism. Despite the public admission of the theatrical nature of professional wrestling, many U.S. states still regulate professional wrestling as they do other professional competitive sports. For example, New York State still regulates "professional wrestling" through the New York State Athletic Commission (SAC). Some states are considering removing, or have removed, professional wrestling from the purview of the state's athletic commissioners.

Performance aspects 

Professional wrestling shows can be considered a form of theater in the round, with the ring, ringside area, and entryway comprising a stage. There is less of a fourth wall than in most theatric performances, similar to pantomime involving audience participation. The audience is recognized and acknowledged by the performers as spectators to the sporting event being portrayed, and are encouraged to interact as such. This leads to a high level of audience participation; in fact, their reactions can dictate how the performance unfolds. Often, individual matches will be part of a longer story line conflict between "babyfaces" (often shortened to just "faces") and "heels". "Faces" (the "good guys") are those whose actions are intended to encourage the audience to cheer, while "heels" (the "bad guys") act to draw the spectators' ire.

In pro wrestling matches, performers often execute a series of pre-planned moves and attacks, ranging from grappling and throws found in some traditional forms of wrestling, to more spectacular stunts, sometimes involving props and special effects. The attacks in these matches are designed to appear dramatic whilst reducing the risk of serious injury as much as possible. Overall, the performers aim to minimize the actual injurious impact of their moves while maximizing their entertainment value. Shows produced by the largest professional wrestling promotions like WWE are traditionally performed in indoor venues, flagship events in this profession like WrestleMania are sometimes staged at outdoor venues; these shows are generally video recorded for live or delayed broadcasting for an audience all over the world. Additionally filmed footage known as “segments” or “promos” are usually used to accompany the drama in these shows.
 
Prior experience in legitimate wrestling is not a requirement for aspiring professional wrestlers, but is seen as an advantageous background. Despite its scripted format, there have been quite a number of performers throughout the history of pro wrestling who have had prior experience in legitimate wrestling, before transitioning to its theatrical form. A popular performer, Kurt Angle, is the first Olympic gold medalist in professional wrestling history, having won his gold medal at the 1996 Summer Olympic Games in freestyle wrestling. Another prominent performer is Brock Lesnar, a former NCAA Wrestler who won the NCAA Division I National Championship in 2000.

Dramatic elements 

While each wrestling match is ostensibly a competition of athletics and strategy, the goal from a business standpoint is to excite and entertain the audience. Although the competition is staged, dramatic emphasis draws out the most intense reaction. Heightened interest results in higher attendance, increased ticket sales, higher ratings on television broadcasts (greater ad revenue), higher pay-per-view buyrates, and sales of branded merchandise and recorded video footage. All of these contribute to the profit of the promotion company.

Character/gimmick 

In Latin America and English-speaking countries, most wrestlers (and other on-stage performers) portray character roles, sometimes with personalities wildly different from their own. These personalities are a gimmick intended to heighten interest in a wrestler without regard to athletic ability. Some can be unrealistic and cartoon-like (such as Doink the Clown), while others carry more verisimilitude (such as Chris Jericho, The Rock, John Cena, Steve Austin, and CM Punk). In lucha libre, many characters wear masks, adopting a secret identity akin to a superhero or a supervillain, a near-sacred tradition.

An individual wrestler may use their real name, or a minor variation of it, for much of their career, such as Bret Hart, John Cena and Randy Orton. Others can keep one ring name for their entire career (Shawn Michaels, CM Punk and Ricky Steamboat), or may change from time to time to better suit the demands of the audience or company. Sometimes a character is owned and trademarked by the company, forcing the wrestler to find a new one when he leaves (although a simple typeset change, such as changing Rhyno to Rhino, can get around this), and sometimes a character is owned by the wrestler. Sometimes, a wrestler may change their legal name to obtain ownership of their ring name (Andrew Martin and Warrior). Many wrestlers (such as The Rock and The Undertaker) are strongly identified with their character, even responding to the name in public or between friends. Proper decorum is for wrestlers to refer to each other by their stage names/characters rather than their birth/legal names, unless otherwise introduced. A character can become so popular that it appears in other media (Hulk Hogan and El Santo) or even gives the performer enough visibility to enter politics (Antonio Inoki and Jesse Ventura).

Typically, matches are staged between a protagonist (historically an audience favorite, known as a babyface, or "the good guy") and an antagonist (historically a villain with arrogance, a tendency to break rules, or other unlikable qualities, called a heel, or "the bad guy"). In recent years, antiheroes have also become prominent in professional wrestling. There is also a less common role of a "tweener", who is neither fully face nor fully heel yet able to play either role effectively (case in point, Samoa Joe during his first run in Impact Wrestling from June 2005 to November 2006).

At times, a character may "turn", altering their face/heel alignment. This may be an abrupt, surprising event, or it may slowly build over time. It is almost always accomplished with a markable change in behavior. Some turns become defining points in a career, as when Hulk Hogan turned heel after being a top face for over a decade. Others may have no noticeable effect on the character's status. If a character repeatedly switches between face and heel, this lessens the effect of such turns, and may result in apathy from the audience. Big Show is a good example of having more heel and face turns than anyone in WWE history. Sometimes a character's heel turn will become so popular that eventually the audience response will alter the character's heel-face cycle to the point where the heel persona will, in practice, become a face persona, and what was previously the face persona, will turn into the heel persona, such as when Dwayne Johnson first began using "The Rock" persona as a heel character, as opposed to his original "Rocky Maivia" babyface persona. Another legendary example is Stone Cold Steve Austin, who was originally booked as a heel, with such mannerisms as drinking on the job, using profanity, breaking company property, and even breaking into people's private homes. The fans' response to Austin was so positive that he effectively became one of the most popular antiheroes in professional wrestling. Austin, along with the stable of D-Generation X, Bret Hart and his Hart Foundation, is generally credited with ushering the Attitude Era of WWF programming.

Story 
While real exhibition matches are now not uncommon, most matches tell a story analogous to an episode of a serial drama: the face will from time to time win (triumph) or from time to time lose (tragedy), and longer story arcs can result from a couple of matches. Since most promotions have a championship title, opposition for the championship is a frequent impetus for stories. For added stakes, anything from a character's own hair to their job can be wagered in a match.

Some matches are designed to further the story of only one participant. It could be intended to portray an unstoppable force, a lucky underdog, a sore loser, or any other characterization. Sometimes non-wrestling vignettes are shown to enhance a character's image without the need for matches.

Other stories result from a natural rivalry. Outside of performance, these are referred to as feuds. A feud can exist between any number of participants and can last from a few days to decades. The feud between Ric Flair and Ricky Steamboat lasted from the late 1970s into the early 1990s and allegedly spanned over two thousand matches (although most of those matches were mere dark matches). The career-spanning history between characters Mike Awesome and Masato Tanaka is another example of a long-running feud, as is the case of Steve Austin vs. Vince McMahon, one of the most lucrative feuds in the World Wrestling Federation during 1998 and 1999.

In theory, the longer a feud is built up, the more audience interest (aka heat) lasts. The main event of a wrestling show is generally the most heated. Commonly, a heel will hold the upper hand over a face until a final showdown, heightening dramatic tension as the face's fans desire to see them win.

Throughout the history of professional wrestling, many other elements of media have been utilized in professional wrestling storytelling: pre- and post-match interviews, "backstage" skits, positions of authority and worked behind-the-scenes feuds, division rankings (typically the #1-contendership spot), contracts, lotteries, news stories on websites, and in recent years social media.

Anything that can be used as an element of drama can exist in professional wrestling stories: romantic relationships (including love triangles and marriage), racism, classism, nepotism, favoritism, corporate corruption, family bonds, personal histories, grudges, theft, cheating, assault, betrayal, bribery, seduction, stalking, confidence tricks, extortion, blackmail, substance abuse, self-doubt, self-sacrifice; even kidnapping, sexual fetishism, necrophilia, misogyny, rape and death have been portrayed in wrestling. Some promotions have included supernatural elements such as magic, curses, the undead and Satanic imagery (most notably the Undertaker and his Ministry of Darkness, a stable that regularly performed evil rituals and human sacrifice in Satanic-like worship of a hidden power figure).

Commentators have become important in communicating the relevance of the characters' actions to the story at hand, filling in past details and pointing out subtle actions that may otherwise go unnoticed.

Promos 

A main part of the story-telling part of wrestling is a promo, short for promotional interview. Promos are performed, or "cut" in wrestling jargon, for a variety of reasons, including to heighten interest in a wrestler, or to hype an upcoming match.

Since the crowd is often too loud or the venue too large for promos to be heard naturally, wrestlers will use amplification when speaking in the ring. Unlike most Hollywood acting, large and highly visible handheld microphones are typically used and wrestlers often speak directly to the audience.

Championships 

Professional wrestling mimics the structure of title match combat sports. Participants compete for a championship and must defend it after winning it. These titles are represented physically by a title belt that can be worn by the champion. In the case of team wrestling, there is a title belt for each member of the team.

Almost all professional wrestling promotions have one major title, and some have more. Championships are designated by divisions of weight, height, gender, wrestling style and other qualifications.

Typically, each promotion only recognizes the "legitimacy" of their own titles, although cross-promotion does happen. When one promotion absorbs or purchases another, the titles from the defunct promotion may continue to be defended in the new promotion or be decommissioned. Behind the scenes, the bookers in a company will place the title on the most accomplished performer, or those the bookers believe will generate fan interest in terms of event attendance and television viewership. Historically, a world champion was typically a legit shooter/hooker who had the skills to prevent double crosses by shooters who would deviate from the planned finish for personal glory. Lower ranked titles may also be used on the performers who show potential, thus allowing them greater exposure to the audience. Other circumstances may also determine the use of a championship. A combination of a championship's lineage, the caliber of performers as champion, and the frequency and manner of title changes, dictates the audience's perception of the title's quality, significance and reputation.

A wrestler's championship accomplishments can be central to their career, becoming a measure of their performance ability and drawing power. In general, a wrestler with multiple title reigns or an extended title reign is indicative of a wrestler's ability to maintain audience interest or a wrestler's ability to perform in the ring. As such, the most accomplished or decorated wrestlers tend to be revered as legends due to the amount of title reigns they hold. American wrestler Ric Flair has had multiple world heavyweight championship reigns spanning over three decades. Japanese wrestler Último Dragón once held and defended a record ten titles simultaneously.

Non-standard matches 

Often a match will take place under additional rules, usually serving as a special attraction or a climactic point in a feud or storyline. Sometimes this will be the culmination of an entire feud, ending it for the immediate future (known as a blowoff match).

Perhaps the most well-known non-standard match is the cage match, in which the ring is surrounded by a fence or similar metal structure, with the express intention of preventing escape or outside interference—and with the added bonus of the cage being a potentially brutal weapon or platform for launching attacks. The WWE has another provision where a standard cage match can end with one wrestler or wrestling team escaping the cage through the door or over the top.

Another example is the WWE's Royal Rumble match, which involves thirty participants in a random and unknown order. The Rumble match is itself a spectacle in that it is a once-yearly event with multiple participants, including individuals who might not interact otherwise. It also serves as a catalyst for the company's ongoing feuds, as well as a springboard for new storylines. The WWE has made many other match types such as the Inferno Match and the First Blood match.

Ring entrance 

While the wrestling matches themselves are the primary focus of professional wrestling, a key dramatic element of the business can be entrances of the wrestlers to the arena and ring. It is typical for a wrestler to get their biggest crowd reaction (or "pop") for their ring entrance, rather than for anything they do in the wrestling match itself, especially if former main event stars are returning to a promotion after a long absence.

All notable wrestlers now enter the ring accompanied by music, and regularly add other elements to their entrance. The music played during the ring entrance will usually mirror the wrestler's personality. Many wrestlers, particularly in America, have music and lyrics specially written for their ring entrance. While invented long before, the practice of including music with the entrance gained rapid popularity during the 1980s, largely as a result of the huge success of Hulk Hogan and the WWF, and their Rock 'n' Wrestling Connection. When a match is won, the victor's theme music is usually also played in celebration.

Because wrestling is predetermined, a wrestler's entrance music will play as they enter the arena, even if they are, in kayfabe, not supposed to be there. For example, in 2012 through 2014, The Shield was a trio of wrestlers who were (in kayfabe) not at the time under contract with WWE (hence their gimmick of entering the ring through the crowd), but they still had entrance music which was played whenever they entered the arena, despite the fact that they were kayfabe invaders.

With the introduction of the Titantron entrance screen in 1997, WWF wrestlers also had entrance videos play along with their music.

Other dramatic elements of a ring entrance can include:

 Pyrotechnics such as a ring of fire for The Brood when they ascend to the stage, multi-colour fireworks (most notably for Edge), fire for Kane and Seth Rollins, a stage of smoke for Finn Bálor and (for a short period of time) falling fireworks for Christian Cage.
 Additional visual graphics or staging props to complement the entrance video/routine or further emphasize the character. For instance, Kane's entrance graphics employ heavy use of fire-themed visuals, The Undertaker's entrance features dark lighting, fire, fog and dry ice, and lightning-themed effects, and Goldust has been known to use on-screen visual effects in his entrance to simulate the presentation of a feature film (i.e. widescreen, production company credits), as to emphasize his Hollywood-themed film aficionado character. 
 A distinct sound or opening note in the music (used to elicit a Pavlovian response from the crowd). For example, the glass shattering in Steve Austin's entrance theme, The Undertaker's signature bell toll, sirens, such as used by Scott Steiner or Right to Censor and the sound of bells and a cow's moo in JBL's theme.
 Darkening of the arena, often accompanied by mood lighting or strobe lighting, such as in The Undertaker's, Triple H's, or Sting's entrances. Certain colors of lighting have been associated with specific wrestlers; for instance, blue lighting for The Undertaker and Alexa Bliss, green lighting for Triple H, D-Generation X, and Shane McMahon, a mixture of red and yellow lighting for Brock Lesnar, a lot of red for Seth Rollins (mainly for his "Embrace The Vision" character, a.k.a when using his theme named "Visionary"), a mixture of red and orange lighting for Kane, multicolored lighting for John Morrison, gold lighting for Goldust, pink lighting for Val Venis and Trish Stratus, and so forth.
 Driving a vehicle into the arena. For example, Eddie Guerrero arrived in a lowrider, The Undertaker (in his "American Bad Ass" biker gimmick), Chuck Palumbo, Tara, and the Disciples of Apocalypse on motorcycles, The Mexicools on riding lawn mowers, JBL in his limousine, Alberto Del Rio arriving into the arena in various luxury cars, Steve Austin driving an all-terrain vehicle, and Camacho and Hunico entering on a lowrider bicycle.
 Talking to the crowd using a distinctive patter. For instance, chanting or rapping along with the music (i.e. Road Dogg, R-Truth). Another example is Vickie Guerrero entering to no music, but announcing her arrival with the words "Excuse me!"
 Many heels with narcissistic gimmicks (Lex Luger, Shawn Michaels, Cody Rhodes, Paul Orndorff, etc.) admired themselves in mirrors on their way to the ring.
 Coming through the audience, such as The Sandman's beer drinking and can smashing entrance, or Diamond Dallas Page's exit through the crowd, or Jon Moxley entering through the crowd.
 Accompaniment by a ringside crew or personal security, as Goldberg did.
 Entering the arena by a lift in the stage, such as Kurt Angle, The Brood and Rey Mysterio

Special ring entrances are also developed for big occasions, most notably the WrestleMania event. For example, WrestleMania III and VI both saw all wrestlers enter the arena on motorized miniature wrestling rings. Live bands are sometimes hired to perform live entrance music at special events. John Cena and Triple H are particularly notable in recent years for their highly theatrical entrances at WrestleMania.

Women participation

The women's division of professional wrestling has maintained a recognized world champion since 1937, when Mildred Burke won the original World Women's title. She then formed the World Women's Wrestling Association in the early 1950s and recognized herself as the first champion, although the championship was vacated upon her retirement in 1956. The NWA ceased to acknowledge Burke as the Women's World champion in 1954, and instead acknowledged June Byers as champion after a controversial finish to a high-profile match between Burke and Byers that year. Upon Byers's retirement in 1964, The Fabulous Moolah, who won a junior heavyweight version of the NWA World Women's Championship (the predecessor to the WWE Women's Championship) in a tournament back in 1958, was recognized by most NWA promoters as champion by default.

Intergender 

For most of its history, men and women rarely worked against each other in professional wrestling, as it was deemed to be unfair and unchivalrous. Andy Kaufman used this to gain notoriety when he created an Intergender Championship and declared it open to any female challenger. This led to a long (worked) feud with Jerry Lawler.

Cathy Davis sued the New York State Athletic Commission (NYSAC) in 1977 because she was denied a boxing license because she was a woman, and the case was decided in her favor later that year, with the judge 
invalidating New York State rule number 205.15, which stated, "No woman may be licensed as a boxer or second or licensed to compete in any wrestling exhibition with men." In his opinion the judge cited the precedent set by Garrett v. New York State Athletic Commission (1975), which "found the regulation invalid under the equal protection clauses of the State and Federal Constitutions". The NYSAC filed an appeal of the ruling, but later dropped it.

In the 1980s, mixed tag team matches began to take place, with a male and female on each team and a rule stating that each wrestler could only attack the opponent of the same gender. If a tag was made, the other team had to automatically switch their legal wrestler as well. Despite these restrictions, many mixed tag matches do feature some physical interaction between participants of different genders. For example, a heel may take a cheap shot at the female wrestler of the opposing team to draw a negative crowd reaction. In lucha libre, cheap shots and male-female attacks are not uncommon.

Intergender singles bouts were first fought on a national level in the 1990s. This began with Luna Vachon, who faced men in ECW and WWF. Later, Chyna became the first female to hold a belt that was not exclusive to women when she won the WWF Intercontinental Championship. Intergender wrestling was uncommon in Impact Wrestling. ODB, had participated in intergender matches and once held the Impact Knockouts Tag Team Championship with Eric Young for a record 478 days. Other notable Impact Knockouts that competed in intergender matches include Scarlett Bordeaux; Tessa Blanchard, who became the first woman to win the Impact World Championship; and Jordynne Grace, who became the inaugural Impact Digital Media Championship.

Midget wrestling

Midget wrestling can be traced to professional wrestling's carnival and vaudeville origins. In recent years, the popularity and prevalence of midgets in wrestling has greatly decreased due to wrestling companies depriving midget divisions of storyline or feud. WWE has made a few attempts to enter this market with their "minis" in the 1990s and the "junior's league" as recent as 2006. It is still a popular form of entertainment in Mexican wrestling, mostly as a "sideshow".

Some wrestlers may have their own specific "mini me", like Mascarita Sagrada, Alebrije has Quije, etc. There are also cases in which midgets can become valets for a wrestler, and even get physically involved in matches, like Alushe, who often accompanies Tinieblas, or KeMonito, who is portrayed as Consejo Mundial de Lucha Libre's mascot and is also a valet for Mistico. Dave Finlay was often aided in his matches by a midget known mainly as Hornswoggle while in WWE, who hid under the ring and gave a shillelagh to Finlay to use on his opponent. Finlay also occasionally threw him at his opponents. Hornswoggle was given a run with the WWE Cruiserweight Championship and feuded with D-X in 2009.

Country differences 

The U.S., Japan and Mexico are the three countries where there is a huge market and high popularity for professional wrestling, but the wrestling styles of each region are different, given their independent development for a long period.

Professional wrestling in the U.S. tends to have a heavy focus on story building and the establishment of characters (and their personalities). There is a story for each match, and even a longer story for successive matches. The stories usually contain characters like faces, heels, and - less often - "tweeners" (antiheroes). It is a "triumph" if the face wins, while it is a "tragedy" if the heel wins. The characters usually have strong and sharp personalities. The opposition between faces and heels is very intense in the story, and the heels may even attack the faces during TV interviews. The relationship between different characters can also be very complex.

Although professional wrestling in Mexico (Lucha libre) also has stories and characters, they are less emphasized. Mexican professional wrestling tradition repeats very usually brutal tactics, specially more aerial holds than professional wrestlers in the U.S. who, more often, rely on power moves and strikes to subdue their opponents. The difference in styles is due to the independent evolution of the sport in Mexico beginning in the 1930s and the fact that wrestlers in the cruiserweight division are often the most popular wrestlers in Mexican lucha libre. Wrestlers often execute high flying moves characteristic of lucha libre by utilizing the wrestling ring's ropes to catapult themselves towards their opponents, using intricate combinations in rapid-fire succession, and applying complex submission holds. Lucha libre is also known for its tag team wrestling matches, in which the teams are often made up of three members, instead of two as is common in the U.S.

The style of Japanese professional wrestling (puroresu) is also different. With its origins in traditional American style of wrestling and still being under the same genre, it has become an entity in itself. Despite the similarity to its American counterpart, in that the outcome of the matches remains predetermined, the phenomena are different in the form of the psychology and presentation of the sport. In most of the largest promotions, such as New Japan Pro-Wrestling, All Japan Pro Wrestling and Pro Wrestling Noah, it is treated as a full contact combat sport as it mixes hard hitting martial arts strikes with shoot style submission holds, while in the U.S. it is rather more regarded as an entertainment show. Wrestlers incorporate kicks and strikes from martial arts disciplines, and a strong emphasis is placed on submission wrestling, and unlike the use of involved storylines in the U.S., they are not as intricate in Japan; more emphasis is placed on the concept of "fighting spirit", meaning the wrestlers' display of physical and mental stamina are valued a lot more than theatrics. Many of Japan's wrestlers including top stars such as Shinya Hashimoto, Riki Chōshū and Keiji Mutoh came from a legitimate martial arts background and many Japanese wrestlers in the 1990s began to pursue careers in mixed martial arts organizations such as Pancrase and Shooto which at the time retained the original look of puroresu but were actual competitions. Other companies, such as Michinoku Pro Wrestling and Dragon Gate, wrestle in a style similar to Mexican companies like AAA and CMLL. This is known as "Lucharesu".

Developed culture 

Professional wrestling has developed its own unique culture.

Those involved in producing professional wrestling have developed a kind of global fraternity, with familial bonds, shared language and passed-down traditions. New performers are expected to "pay their dues" for a few years by working in lower-profile promotions and working as ring crew before working their way upward. The permanent rosters of most promotions develop a backstage pecking order, with veterans mediating conflicts and mentoring younger wrestlers. For many decades (and still to a lesser extent today) performers were expected to keep the illusions of wrestling's legitimacy alive even while not performing, essentially acting in character any time they were in public. Some veterans speak of a "sickness" among wrestling performers, an inexplicable pull to remain active in the wrestling world despite the devastating effects the job can have on one's life and health.

Fans of professional wrestling have their own subculture, comparable to those of science fiction, video games, or comic books. Those who are interested in the backstage occurrences, future storylines and reasonings behind company decisions read newsletters written by journalists with inside ties to the wrestling industry. These "rags" or "dirt sheets" have expanded into the Internet, where their information can be dispensed on an up-to-the-minute basis. Some have expanded into radio shows.

Some fans enjoy a pastime of collecting recordings of wrestling shows from specific companies, of certain wrestlers, or of specific genres. The internet has given fans exposure to worldwide variations of wrestling they are unable to otherwise see. Since the 1990s, many companies have been founded which deal primarily in wrestling footage. When the WWE purchased both WCW and ECW in 2001, they also obtained the entire past video libraries of both productions and have released many past matches online and on home video.

Like some other sports, fantasy leagues have developed around professional wrestling. Some take this concept further by creating E-feds (electronic federations), where a user can create their own fictional wrestling character, and role-playing storylines with other users, leading to scheduled "shows" where match results are determined by the organizers, usually based on a combination of the characters' statistics and the players' roleplaying aptitude, sometimes with audience voting.

Mainstream 

From the first established world championship, the top professional wrestlers have garnered fame within mainstream society. Each successive generation has produced a number of wrestlers who extend their careers into the realms of music, acting, writing, business, politics or public speaking, and are known to those who are unfamiliar with wrestling in general. Conversely, celebrities from other sports or general pop culture also become involved with wrestling for brief periods of time. A prime example of this is The Rock 'n' Wrestling Connection of the 1980s, which combined wrestling with MTV.

Professional wrestling is often portrayed within other works using parody, and its general elements have become familiar tropes and memes in American culture.

Some terminology originating in professional wrestling has found its way into the common vernacular. Phrases such as "body slam", "sleeper hold" and "tag team" are used by those who do not follow professional wrestling. The term "smackdown", popularized by The Rock and SmackDown! in the 1990s, has been included in Merriam-Webster dictionaries since 2007.

Many television shows and films have been produced which portray in-character professional wrestlers as protagonists, such as Ready to Rumble, ¡Mucha Lucha!, Nacho Libre, and the Santo film series. At least two stage plays set in the world of pro wrestling have been produced: The Baron is a comedy that retells the life of an actual performer known as Baron von Raschke. From Parts Unknown... is an award-nominated Canadian drama about the rise and fall of a fictional wrestler. The 2009 South Park episode "W.T.F." played on the soap operatic elements of professional wrestling. One of the lead characters on the Disney Channel series Kim Possible was a huge fan of pro wrestling and actually featured it on an episode (with two former WWE wrestlers voicing the two fictitious wrestlers featured in the episode). The 2008 film The Wrestler, about a washed-up professional wrestler, garnered several Oscar nominations. The 2017 TV series GLOW, based on the Gorgeous Ladies of Wrestling promotion, gained critical acclaim, including a nomination for Outstanding Comedy Series at the 70th Primetime Emmy Awards.

The 1950 film noir Night and the City, directed by Jules Dassin and starring Richard Widmark and Gene Tierney, told the story of a promoter in London trying to make it big, and featured a match involving real professional wrestler Stanislaus Zbyszko.

Wrestling has also gained a major following on YouTube, with WWE being the most subscribed wrestling channel and sixth most subscribed channel in the world. Other promotions, such as All Elite Wrestling, Major League Wrestling, Impact Wrestling and the National Wrestling Alliance have distributed their own weekly programming on the platform.

Study and analysis 

With its growing popularity, professional wrestling has attracted attention as a subject of serious academic study and journalistic criticism. Many courses, theses, essays and dissertations have analyzed wrestling's conventions, content, and its role in modern society. It is often included as part of studies on theatre, sociology, performance, and media. The Massachusetts Institute of Technology developed a course of study on the cultural significance of professional wrestling, and anthropologist Heather Levi has written an ethnography about the culture of lucha libre in Mexico.

In the early 20th century, once it became apparent that the "sport" was worked, pro wrestling was looked down on as a cheap entertainment for the uneducated working class, an attitude that still exists to varying degrees today. The French theorist Roland Barthes was among the first to propose that wrestling was worthy of deeper analysis, in his essay "The World of Wrestling" from his book Mythologies, first published in 1957. Barthes argued that it should be looked at not as a scamming of the ignorant, but as spectacle; a mode of theatric performance for a willing, if bloodthirsty, audience. Wrestling is described as performed art which demands an immediate reading of the juxtaposed meanings. The logical conclusion is given least importance over the theatrical performers of the wrestlers and the referee. According to Barthes, the function of a wrestler is not to win: it is to go exactly through the motions which are expected of him and to give the audience a theatrical spectacle. This work is considered a foundation of all later study.

While pro wrestling is often described simplistically as a "soap opera for males", it has also been cited as filling the role of past forms of literature and theatre; a synthesis of classical heroics, commedia dell'arte, revenge tragedies, morality plays, and burlesque. The characters and storylines portrayed by a successful promotion are seen to reflect the current mood, attitudes, and concerns of that promotion's society and can in turn influence those same things. Wrestling's high levels of violence and masculinity make it a vicarious outlet for aggression during peacetime.

Documentary filmmakers have studied the lives of wrestlers and the effects the profession has on them and their families. The 1999 theatrical documentary Beyond the Mat focused on Terry Funk, a wrestler nearing retirement; Mick Foley, a wrestler within his prime; Jake Roberts, a former star fallen from grace; and a school of wrestling students trying to break into the business. The 2005 release Lipstick and Dynamite, Piss and Vinegar: The First Ladies of Wrestling chronicled the development of women's wrestling throughout the 20th century. Pro wrestling has been featured several times on HBO's Real Sports with Bryant Gumbel. MTV's documentary series True Life featured two episodes titled "I'm a Professional Wrestler" and "I Want to Be a Professional Wrestler". Other documentaries have been produced by The Learning Channel (The Secret World of Professional Wrestling) and A&E (Hitman Hart: Wrestling with Shadows). Bloodstained Memoirs explored the careers of several pro wrestlers, including Chris Jericho, Rob Van Dam and Roddy Piper.

Injury and fatality 

Although professional wrestling is choreographed, there is a high chance of injury, and even death. Strikes are often stiff, especially in Japan, and in independent wrestling promotions such as Combat Zone Wrestling. The ring is often made out of  timber planks. There have been many brutal accidents, hits and injuries. Many of the injuries that occur in pro wrestling are shoulders, knee, back, neck, and rib injuries. Professional wrestler Davey Richards said in 2015, "We train to take damage, we know we are going to take damage and we accept that."

As of february 2023, 31 years after the 1990 WrestleMania VI, 17 of the 38 competitors had died, including André the Giant and main event winner The Ultimate Warrior, with only two of the deceased having reached the age of 64 (Dusty Rhodes at 69 and "Superfly" Jimmy Snuka at 73).

See also 
 History of professional wrestling
 Independent circuit
 Professional wrestling moves (disambiguation)

Terminology 
 Foreign objects (e.g. folding chair)
 Glossary of professional wrestling terms
 Professional wrestling match types
 Professional wrestling tag team match types
 Professional wrestling tournament

Lists of wrestlers 
 List of family relations in professional wrestling
 List of professional wrestling rosters

Types of professional wrestling 
 All-in professional wrestling
 Fantasy wrestling
 Hardcore wrestling
 Lucha libre
 Modern Freestyle wrestling
 Puroresu

Radio programs 
 Live Audio Wrestling
 Talksport
 Wrestling Observer Live

In fiction 
 List of wrestling-based comic books
 The Wrestler

References

Citations

Sources

Further reading

External links 

 Online World of Wrestling
 Pro Wrestling History
 Pro-Wrestling Title Histories

	

 
Performing arts
Sports entertainment
Wrestling